Aleksandr Tikhonovich Fomchenko (born 15 October 1961) is a Russian rower. He competed at the 1980 Summer Olympics in Moscow with the men's double sculls for the Soviet Union where they came fifth.

References

External links 
 
 

1961 births
Living people
Russian male rowers
Olympic rowers of the Soviet Union
Rowers at the 1980 Summer Olympics